Debbie Williams (born 1956) is an American teacher from Post, Texas, who was involved in a famous skydiving incident on April 18, 1987, in Coolidge, Arizona.

Incident
On April 18, 1987, while skydiving with a group of people, Williams collided with fellow sky diver Guy Fitzwater at 9,000 feet and was knocked unconscious. Instructor Gregory Robertson, seeing her falling to her death, dove toward her, and caught up with her at 3,500 feet, ten seconds before impact. He pulled her rip cord at 2,000 feet, saving her life. She suffered a skull fracture, broken ribs, and an injured kidney, but survived. The incident received wide attention with Robertson receiving many awards and the event itself being reenacted on episodes of Rescue 911 and It's a Miracle. It was also listed for years in The Guinness Book Of Records as the lowest midair rescue ever.

References

1950s births
Living people
Schoolteachers from Texas
American women educators
American skydivers
People from Post, Texas
Place of birth missing (living people)
21st-century American women